Betanin, or Beetroot Red, is a red glycosidic food dye obtained from beets; its aglycone, obtained by hydrolyzing away the glucose molecule, is betanidin. As a food additive, its E number is E162.

The color of betanin depends on pH; between four and five it is bright bluish-red, becoming blue-violet as the pH increases. Once the pH reaches alkaline levels betanin degrades by hydrolysis, resulting in a yellow-brown color.

Betanin is a betalain pigment, together with isobetanin, probetanin, and neobetanin. Other pigments contained in beet are indicaxanthin and vulgaxanthins.

Sources 
Betanin is usually obtained from the extract of beet juice; the concentration of betanin in red beet can reach 300–600 mg/kg. Other dietary sources of betanin and other betalains include the Opuntia cactus, Swiss chard, and the leaves of some strains of amaranth.

Uses 
The most common uses of betanins are in coloring ice cream and powdered soft drink beverages; other uses are in some sugar confectionery, e.g. fondants, sugar strands, sugar coatings, and fruit or cream fillings. In hot processed candies, it can be used if added at the final part of the processing. Betanin is also used in soups as well as tomato and bacon products. Betanin has "not been implicated as causing clinical food allergy when used as a coloring agent".

Betanin can be also used for coloring meat and sausages.

Betanin has also shown to have antimicrobial activity and can be used as a natural antimicrobial agent in food preservation.

Degradation and stability
Betanin degrades when subjected to light, heat, and oxygen; therefore, it is used in frozen products, products with short shelf life, or products sold in dry state. Betanin can survive pasteurization when in products with high sugar content. Its sensitivity to oxygen is highest in products with a high water content and/or containing metal cations (e.g. iron and copper); antioxidants like ascorbic acid and sequestrants can slow this process down, together with suitable packaging. In dry form betanin is stable in the presence of oxygen.

See also 
 Betalain

References

Further reading
 

Biological pigments
Food colorings
Glucosides
Betalains
Indoles
E-number additives
Enoic acids